Puente Hills Landfill was the largest landfill in the United States, rising  high and covering . Originally opened in 1957 in a back canyon in the Puente Hills, the landfill was made to meet the demands of urbanization and waste-disposal east of Los Angeles. By the 1990s, the landfill became an artificial mountain visible around the San Gabriel Valley region. Puente Hills accepted four million tons of waste in 2005. As of October 31, 2013, its operating permit was terminated and it no longer accepts new refuse. The former landfill is in the process of becoming a natural habitat preservation area.

The landfill is located in the Puente Hills, in southeastern Los Angeles County near Whittier, California and is owned and operated by the Sanitation Districts of Los Angeles County. The closest urban communities are unincorporated Hacienda Heights to the east, and unincorporated Avocado Heights and the City of Industry to the north.

Gas to energy
15 m3/s of landfill gas created by the landfill is funneled to the Puente Hills Gas-to-Energy Facility, which generates more than 40 MW of power.

Recycling
At the base of the former landfill is a modern recycling facility. The facility is operated with the intent to recover and divert recyclables and combustible material.

Habitat and park
The Puente Hills Landfill offers tours. The Puente Hills Landfill Native Habitat Preservation Authority directs the acquisition, restoration, and management of open space in the Puente Hills for preservation of the land to protect the biological diversity and provide opportunities for outdoor education and low-impact recreation.

In popular culture
The landfill has gained some popular attention.  Penn and Teller visited the landfill in an episode of their television program Bullshit! to assess the validity of recycling, and the television documentary series MegaStructures focused on the landfill in the episode "Garbage Mountain".

Edward Humes discusses the landfill extensively as a core part of his book Garbology: Our Dirty Love Affair with Trash.

See also
Puente Hills
Waste-to-energy
Landfill in the United States

References

External links
 Official Puente Hills Landfill Website
 Puente Hills Gas-To-Energy Facility

Power stations in California
Landfills in California
Puente Hills
Landforms of Los Angeles County, California
Avocado Heights, California
Hacienda Heights, California
City of Industry, California
Whittier, California
Environment of Greater Los Angeles